Bagous nodulosus is a species of beetle belonging to the family Curculionidae.

It is native to Europe.

Synonyms:
 Dicranthus nodulosus
 Hydronomus nodulosus

References

Curculionidae